Asur is a village in the Kumbakonam taluk of Thanjavur district, Tamil Nadu.

Demographics 

As per the 2001 census, Asur had a total population of 2212 with 1095 males and 1117 females. The sex ratio was 1020. The literacy rate was 67.47.

References 

 

Villages in Thanjavur district